"Vicious" is a song recorded by American singer Sabrina Carpenter from her fifth studio album Emails I Can't Send (2022), included as the second track of the album. The track was written by Carpenter, Amy Allen and its producer Jason Evigan. The song was released by Island Records as the third single of the album on July 1, 2022.

Background and release 
On June 15, Carpenter shared a TikTok video with a snippet of the song and its pre-save link.

Credits and personnel 
Recording and management
Recorded at Chumba Meadows (Tarzana, California)
Mixed at Henson Recording Studios (Los Angeles, California)
Mastered at Sterling Sound (Edgewater, New Jersey)
Sabalicious Songs (BMI), Big Tall Guy Music (BMI), administered by Sony/ATV Songs LLC, Kenny + Betty Tunes/superreal Songs/Artist Publishing Group West (ASCAP), all rights administered by Kobalt Songs Music Publishing

Personnel

Sabrina Carpenter – lead vocals, songwriting
 Jason Evigan – songwriting, production, recording, programming, guitar, bass, synths
 Amy Allen – songwriting
 Jackson Rau – recording
 Josh Gudwin – mixing
 Heidi Wang – mix engineer
 Will Quinnell – mastering

Credits adapted from Emails I Can't Send liner notes.

Charts

Release history

References 

2022 songs
2022 singles
Sabrina Carpenter songs
Island Records singles
Songs written by Sabrina Carpenter
Songs written by Jason Evigan
Songs written by Amy Allen (songwriter)
Song recordings produced by Jason Evigan